NB Private Equity Partners is a large British investment company dedicated to investments in private equity investments. Established in 2009, the company is listed on the London Stock Exchange and is a constituent of the FTSE 250 Index. The chairman is William Maltby. It is managed by Neuberger Berman.

References

External links
 Official site

Investment trusts of the United Kingdom